Cynthia Alexander (b. Cynthia Veronica Ayala, 1971) is a singer-songwriter and multi-instrumentalist originally from the Philippines. She has performed on local and international stages including the Rainforest World Music Festival in Malaysia, the Jack Daniel's World Music Tour in Singapore and the Southeast Asian Night Market Festival in New Zealand. She also played gongs and electric bass in foreign engagements (India, U.S., Japan, Canada) with Joey Ayala at ang Bagong Lumad.

As an indie artist, she has released four albums, and is involved in a wide variety of music projects. She composed the eclectic musical score for the Ballet Philippines production, "Wagas", for which she fused electronic, industrial, indigenous, contemporary and pop elements into a cohesive work.

Cynthia is also a self-taught visual artist. She currently resides in Seattle, Washington.  She is the sibling of folk-rock singer-songwriter Joey Ayala.

Recordings
This is a listing of her solo and collaboration albums.  She has collaborated many times with her brother, Joey Ayala.

Awards and nominations

References

External links
 
 
 

Living people
Mindanao artists
Women guitarists
Filipino singer-songwriters
Filipino folk guitarists
Filipino folk singers
Musicians from Seattle
Guitarists from Washington (state)
20th-century Filipino women singers
21st-century Filipino women singers
1971 births